Larsen Grace Thompson (born November 19, 2000) is an American actress, model, and dancer. She is signed to Next Management.

Early life 

Thompson began dancing at an early age when she was 4. At age 9, she was training in hip-hop, tap, contemporary, and ballet. At 12, she began traveling to international dance conventions.

Career 
In 2013, she signed with Zuri Models children's talent agency. She appeared as a dancer/actor in shows, such as American’s Got Talent, Disney Awards for Florida, 2013 Teen Choice Awards with Christina Aguilera and Pitbull, Nickelodeon’s The Fresh Beat Band, The Voice, and X-factor.

At age 15, Thompson got her first big break when her choreographed YouTube video 'IDFWU' went viral, receiving over 4 million views in 2016. Later that year, her choreographed YouTube video for 'Run The World' also went viral, receiving over 8 million views. Thompson also appeared in Sia's music video for The Greatest, and Børns' track American Money in 2016.

In 2017, Thompson was featured in an official dance video for P!nk's Beautiful Trauma, and Katy Perry's video in Chained to the Rhythm.

In 2018, Thompson collaborated with Marc Jacobs for the brand's fragrance Friends of Daisy. Her debut feature film Bloodline with Seann William Scott by Blum House Productions was released in September 2018.

Thompson has modeled for Betsey Johnson, Dior, Fendi, Juicy Couture, Superga, Target, Puma, Gap, Hollister, and others.

She has appeared as a backup dancer for artists, including Børns, Christina Aguilera, Janet Jackson, Katy Perry, P!nk, Sia, Silento, and more. She has also danced alongside Janet Jackson while on her Unbreakable Tour in Southern California, as well as dancing in commercials for Macy's, the Troll's movie with Betsey Johnson, Vogue Italia x Gucci, and others.

Filmography 

 I Am (2010) - Daughter
 Q N' A with Mikki and Shay TV Series (2014) - Self
 Dance Video Throwdown (2016) - Self
 P!nk: Beautiful Trauma - Dance Version Short (2017) - Beautiful
 Mean Girl's Gingle Bell Rock Short (2017)
 LOONA: Butterfly (2019)
 Pearl (2020)
 The Midnight Club (2022) - Julia Jayne

References

External links 
 

2000 births
American film actresses
Living people
21st-century American women